Scaeosopha spinivalvata is a species of moth of the family Cosmopterigidae. It is found in Sabah on Borneo.

The wingspan is about 12.5 mm. The ground colour of the forewings is yellow, tinged with ochreous at the base. The markings are arranged in four rows and consists of black spots and dark-brown patches. The hindwings are deep-brown.

Etymology
The species name refers to the spine-shaped distal quarter of valvella and is derived from the Latin prefix spin- (meaning spine) and valvatus (meaning valve).

References

Moths described in 2012
Scaeosophinae